The English suffix -mania denotes an obsession with something; a mania. The suffix is used in some medical terms denoting mental disorders. It has also entered standard English and is affixed to many different words to denote enthusiasm or obsession with that subject.

Psychological conditions

A
 Aboulomania – indecisiveness (aboulo- (Greek) meaning irresolution or indecision)
 Andromania – human sexual behaviour and desire towards males in females (andro- (Greek) meaning man, men, male or masculine) Can be replaced by hypersexuality, nymphomania, cytheromania or hysteromania.
 Anglomania – England and a passion or obsession with the English (i.e. anglophile) See also anglophobia.
 Arithmomania, arithmomania – numbers and counting (arithmo- (Greek) meaning number)

B
Bibliomania – books and reading (biblio- (Greek) meaning books)

C
Choreomania, choromania – dancing (choreo- (Greek) meaning dance)

D
Demonomania – one's own demonic possession (delusional conviction)
Decalcomania – decal (decorative technique of transferring specially prepared paper prints to ceramic surfaces i.e. glass, porcelain, etc.)
Dermatillomania – picking at the skin
Dipsomania – alcohol (dipso- (Greek) meaning thirst)
Drapetomania – running away from home (pseudoscience)
Dromomania – traveling

E
Egomania – oneself and self-worship (ego- (Latin) meaning I, first person and singular pronoun)
Ergomania, ergasiomania – work (ergasio- or ergo- (Greek) meaning work)
Erotomania – sexual desire or sexual attraction from strangers (delusional conviction) (eroto- (Greek) meaning sexual passion or desire)
Etheromania – ether (ethero- (Greek > Latin) meaning upper air or sky
Eleutheromania – an intense and irresistible desire for freedom

G
Graphomania – writing (grapho- (Greek) meaning to write)

H
Hypermania – severe mania—mental state with high intensity disorientation and often violent behavior, symptomatic of bipolar disorder (hyper- (Greek) meaning abnormal excess)
Hypomania – mild mania—mental state with persistent and pervasive elevated or irritable mood, symptomatic of bipolar disorder (hypo- (Greek) meaning deficient)

K 
 Kleptomania, klopemania – stealing
 Klazomania – screaming

L 
 Logomania – being wordy and talkative i.e. loquacity
 Lisztomania – an obsession with Franz Liszt
 Ludomania – gambling

M 
 Mania – severely elevated mood
 megalomania – wealth and power
 Metromania – writing verse
 Micromania – self-deprecation
 Monomania – a single object, type of object, or concept
 Mythomania – lying

N 
 Necromania – being sexual with dead bodies (necrophilia)
 Nymphomania – an obsolete term for female hypersexuality

O
Oniomania – desire to shop
Onychotillomania – picking at the fingernails

P
Plutomania – money or wealth (ploutos- (Greek) meaning wealth)
Pteridomania – ferns
Pyromania – fire or starting fires

R
Rhinotillexomania – nose picking (rhino- (Greek) meaning nose and tillexis- meaning to pluck, tear, pull or pick at)

S
Satyromania – excessive, often uncontrollable sexual desire in and behavior by a man (satyr- (Greek > Latin) meaning a woodland deity, part man and part goat; riotous merriment and lechery)

T
Theomania – one's own divinity or one's divine mission
Toxicomania – poisons
Trichotillomania – hair removal
Typomania – printing one's works

Other
Beatlemania – the Beatles (an obsession with the Beatles)
Tulipomania – a metaphor for an economic bubble
Trudeaumania – the Canadian politician Pierre Trudeau
Pottermania – Harry Potter

See also
 List of phobias

References 

Glossaries of medicine
Lists of words
Mania
Wikipedia glossaries using unordered lists